The Mystery of the Invisible Thief is a novel written by Enid Blyton. It is the 8th in the popular The Five Find-Outers mystery series also known as the Five Find-Outers and Dog. It was published in 1950

Plot summary
The Five Find-Outers are having a chance tea at a local gymkhana with Inspector Jenks and his goddaughter Hilary when a robbery occurs in a nearby large house.  The mysterious robber disappear the scene of the crime without a trace - as if he were invisible. The burgled house turns out to be the house of Hilary, so the children have the perfect excuse to investigate as they take the upset girl home.

The mysterious thief leaves only a few clues behind - enormous footprints, enormous glove prints, a strange criss-cross mark on the ground and two torn pieces of paper. The clues do not seem to make any sense. Of all the Peterswood villagers, only policeman Mr Goon and Colonel Cross have feet big enough to fit the footprints, and the thief cannot be either of them. The Five Find-Outers and dog decide to find the culprit before Mr. Goon does.

Fatty uses his disguises to gather important information and in doing so outwits Mr Goon, especially when both go at the same time to see Colonel Cross to ask him about his large shoes. Mr Goon disguises himself three times but on each occasion the Find-Outers see through his disguises.

The thief strikes several times, once in Fatty's own shed and at Mrs Williams' house. On each occasion the same clues are found - but apparently nobody sees the thief.

Tired and frustrated at having no progress at catching the thief, Pip plays a practical joke on the others, wearing a pair of giant boots and leaving giant footprints for the others to find and again search in vain for the thief. When found out, the others are angry with Pip - until suddenly Fatty declares that Pip has solved the mystery. The actual thief had done all along what Pip did in jest. The thief is actually the baker, a small man, who used the boots to give the impression that he was a larger man, thus planting a false trail and allowing him to use escape options such as climbing out a window and down a drainpipe that would have been impossible for a man of the apparent size of the thief.

Characters
Fatty (Frederick) Trottevile - Intelligent, smart, brave leader, also good with disguise 
Larry (Laurence) - member of the five and former leader, also the oldest
Daisy - member of the five (making the team is her idea)
Pip (Phillip) Hilton - member of the five
Bets - youngest member of the five
Mr Tonks - policeman who replaced Mr Goon
Mr Goon - the village policeman, who resents the interference of the Five-Find Outers also known as old clear-orf, very mean and hates the five
The baker - a suspect, later found to be the thief
Inspector Jenks - head of the Peterswood police department
Hilary - goddaughter of Inspector Jenks

Note
A similar strategy to the one used in this book - a small man using larger shoes to appear bigger than he is- was used by Blyton's Secret Seven book, Shock for the Secret Seven, although there the criminal was a dog-napper rather than a thief.

External links
Enid Blyton Society page

Novels by Enid Blyton
1950 British novels
Methuen Publishing books
1950 children's books